Felix Neureuther (born 26 March 1984) is a German retired World Cup alpine ski racer and former World champion.

Early life
Born in Munich-Pasing, Neureuther is the son of former World and Olympic champion Rosi Mittermaier and Christian Neureuther, a slalom specialist and winner of six World Cup races. He is the nephew of Evi Mittermaier, who was also a successful alpine ski racer and former Olympian in 1976 and 1980. As of 2020, the combined Neureuther–Mittermaier family has 31 World Cup wins, with 115 podium finishes.

Career
Neureuther was raised in Garmisch-Partenkirchen in Bavaria and was a member of the German national ski team. He has competed in nine World Championships and three Winter Olympics. Neureuther won a silver medal in the slalom at the 2013 World Championships and added a bronze medal in the team event. Previously, he had won a gold medal in the team event in 2005. He won bronze medals in slalom in 2015 and 2017.

Neureuther won his first World Cup race in 2010, in a slalom at Kitzbühel, Austria. He won his only giant slalom in January 2014 at Adelboden, Switzerland, which was only the second victory by a German male in a World Cup giant slalom; Max Rieger won the first in March 1973, nearly 41 years earlier in Quebec.

Through January 2019, Neureuther has thirteen World Cup victories and 47 podiums, making him Germany's most successful male World Cup skier. In March 2019 he announced his retirement from competition ahead of his final race, a slalom at the World Cup finals in Soldeu, Andorra.

World Cup results

Season standings

Race podiums

World Championship results

Olympic results

Personal
Neureuther's parents are both former World Cup ski racers, members of the West German team in the 1970s. His father is Christian Neureuther, winner of six World Cup slaloms, and his mother is Rosi Mittermaier, a World, Olympic, and World Cup champion, all in 1976. At the 1976 Winter Olympics, she won medals in all three alpine events, two golds and a silver. Since 2013 he has been in a relationship with biathlete Miriam Gössner: in October 2017 she gave birth to the couple's first child, a girl named Matilda and the couple married in December same year.

One of Neureuther's childhood friends is footballer Bastian Schweinsteiger: he presented Schweinsteiger with the "Special jury award" at the 2016 Bambi Awards.

References

External links
 
 
 Felix Neureuther at DSV 
 Felix Neureuther at Nordica Skis
  

1984 births
German male alpine skiers
Alpine skiers at the 2006 Winter Olympics
Alpine skiers at the 2010 Winter Olympics
Alpine skiers at the 2014 Winter Olympics
Olympic alpine skiers of Germany
Sportspeople from Garmisch-Partenkirchen
Living people
Audi Sport TT Cup drivers